The DML Butler Bridge is a historic bridge over the North Platte River in Carbon County, Wyoming, United States, that is listed on the National Register of Historic Places (NRHP).

Description
The Camelback through truss bridge is located near Encampment and carries County Road 203. Contractor Chris O'Neil built the bridge in 1920 to replace a wooden bridge built in 1905.

The bridge was added to the NRHP on February 22, 1985. It was one of several bridges added to the NRHP for its role in the history of Wyoming bridge construction.

See also

 National Register of Historic Places listings in Carbon County, Wyoming
 List of bridges documented by the Historic American Engineering Record in Wyoming

References

External links

 Butler Bridge at the Wyoming State Historic Preservation Office
 
 

Road bridges on the National Register of Historic Places in Wyoming
Bridges completed in 1930
Buildings and structures in Carbon County, Wyoming
Truss bridges in the United States
Historic American Engineering Record in Wyoming
National Register of Historic Places in Carbon County, Wyoming
1930 establishments in Wyoming